"Repeated Offender" is the third single from the British indie rock band The Rifles, from their debut record No Love Lost. The single was released in March 2006 and reached number 26 in the UK singles chart, making it the band's biggest hit to date. The song was also number 1 in the UK indie charts for the week of 12 March.

Track listings

References

2006 singles
The Rifles (band) songs
2006 songs